The Lebs is a 2018 novel by Australian author Michael Mohammed Ahmad, published by Hachette. It is a sequel to Ahmad's 2014 novel The Tribe.

The title refers to the usually derogatory slang term sometimes used for Lebanese Australians.

Plot 
The novel centres on protagonist Bani Adam and his experiences of power dynamics, cultural frictions, rape culture and toxic masculinity as a student at Punchbowl Boys High School in Western Sydney.

Awards 
New South Wales Premier's Literary Awards NSW Multicultural Award - 2019 - Winner

Miles Franklin Award - 2019 - Shortlisted

Reviews

References 

2018 Australian novels
Lebanese Australian
Asian-Australian culture
Arab-Australian culture
Hachette Book Group books